MDE may refer to:

Education 
 Master of Distance Education (MDE), a graduate degree offered by Athabasca University, Canada
 Michigan Department of Education, a state agency of Michigan, US
 Minnesota Department of Education, a state agency of Minnesota, US
 Mississippi Department of Education, a state agency of Mississippi, US

Science 
 Major depressive episode
 Methylenedioxyethylamphetamine, a psychoactive drug
 Mid-domain effect spatial/area hypotheses to explain Latitudinal gradients in species diversity
 Methylenedioxyephedrone also known as MDE

Technology 
 Model-driven engineering, the systematic use of models as primary engineering artifacts
 Multi-disciplinary Engineering, an extrapolated version of systems engineering
 In Microsoft Access, mde, the file extension for protected (compiled) databases
 Microsoft Device Emulator, an emulator for Windows Mobile-based devices
 Mitsubishi Design Europe, the design studio of Mitsubishi Motors Europe

Other uses 
 Million Dollar Extreme, a comedy sketch group
 Maximum Downside Exposure, values the maximum downside to the portfolio
 Markit Document Exchange, platform used by financial market participants for distribution of account onboarding or KYC documents
 José María Córdova International Airport (IATA code: MDE), an airport in Colombia
 Major Deegan Expressway in New York City